Rodney Alan Fern (13 December 1948 – 16 January 2018) was an English professional footballer who played as a striker.

Career
Born in Burton upon Trent, Fern played as an amateur for Measham Imps before turning professional in 1967 with Leicester City. He also played for Luton Town, Chesterfield and Rotherham United before retiring in 1983. He was part of the Leicester side that won the 1971 FA Charity Shield.

Fern died on 16 January 2018, after suffering from dementia.

References

1948 births
2018 deaths
Sportspeople from Burton upon Trent
English footballers
Leicester City F.C. players
Luton Town F.C. players
Chesterfield F.C. players
Rotherham United F.C. players
English Football League players
Deaths from dementia in the United Kingdom
Association football forwards
FA Cup Final players